The Dancer of Paris is a lost 1926 American silent drama film produced and distributed by First National Pictures. It was directed by Alfred Santell and starred Dorothy Mackaill. A vintage movie trailer displaying short clips of the film still exists.

Cast
Conway Tearle as Noel Anson
Dorothy Mackaill as Consuelo Cox
Robert Cain as Sir Roy Martel
Henry Vibart as Doctor Frank
Paul Ellis as Cortez
Frances Miller as Mammy (credited as Frances Miller Grant)

References

External links

Stills at silenthollywood.com

1926 films
American silent feature films
Lost American films
Films directed by Alfred Santell
First National Pictures films
American black-and-white films
1926 drama films
1926 lost films
Lost drama films
Silent American drama films
1920s American films